Caroline Casagrande (born November 21, 1976) is a former American government official and political appointee in the administration of President Donald J. Trump who served as Deputy Assistant Secretary of State for Academic Programs at the U.S. Department of State overseeing global public diplomacy programs.  Earlier, Casagrande served as a Deputy Republican leader in the New Jersey General Assembly representing the 11th Legislative District  from January 10, 2012 to January 12, 2016 and the 12th legislative district from January 8, 2008 through January 12, 2012.  Also an attorney, Casagrande is the youngest woman assembly member ever elected in New Jersey.

Early life and family
Casagrande was born in Point Pleasant, and grew up in nearby Spring Lake. She graduated from Red Bank Catholic High School, in Red Bank, New Jersey.

While in college, Casagrande worked in the new democratic government of South Africa during her time studying at the University of Kwa-Zulu Natal-Pietermaritzburg.  Later, she was awarded a Juris Doctor from Rutgers School of Law–Camden.

Casagrande currently lives in Arlington, VA with her husband, Stephen Chance, and three children.

Education
Casagrande earned a B.S. degree from Pennsylvania State University majoring in Political Science. She was elected as Undergraduate Student Government President, where she worked to reduce the cost of student transportation around campus, improve student health care services, and protect students from dramatic tuition increases. In 2010 and 2015 respectively, Pennsylvania State University awarded Casagrande the Young Alumni Achievement Award as well as the Young Alumni Political Science Award.

Casagrande is a double-alumni of the Bureau of Educational and Cultural Affairs.  She was an American Council for Young Political Leaders (ACYPL) delegate to Nepal in 2009. In 2015, Casagrande was awarded the ACYPL fellowship to the East-West Center to study India with parliamentarians from Asia.

Career

Legal 
Casagrande was a partner and attorney with the law firm of Menna, Supko & Casagrande in Shrewsbury, N.J. Previously, she worked as a litigation associate for the firm Cleary, Alfieri Jones & Hoyle (now Cleary, Giacobbe, Alfieri, & Jacobs).  Casagrande has also served as municipal attorney to Manalapan Township and special counsel to Fair Haven.  After graduating from law school, she clerked for New Jersey Superior Court Judge Robert O'Hagan.

New Jersey General Assembly
In 2007, Casagrande ran on the Republican ticket for New Jersey State Assemblywoman of the 12th district alongside Assemblyman Declan O'Scanlon. She defeated an incumbent Assemblyman (Michael J. Panter), and became the youngest woman to ever be elected to the New Jersey General Assembly. Casagrande served in the Assembly on the Appropriations Committee and the Women and Children Committee.

In 2011 Casagrande was redistricted to the 11th Legislative District where she sought re-election along with Senator Jennifer Beck, who was also shifted out of the 12th district, and Assembly member Mary Pat Angelini. They were the first trio of women to be elected as a team to the New Jersey Legislature.

Casagrande served in various leadership positions within the Republican Caucus - eventually rising to Deputy Republican Leader. She also served as a Republican Commissioner on the New Jersey Redistricting Commission, which was charged with redrawing the lines of the State's congressional districts following the 2010 United States census.

Casagrande lost her 2015 bid for re-election to Democratic challengers Joann Downey and Eric Houghtaling. Casagrande finished fourth among the four major party candidates behind Houghtaling, Downey and her Republican running mate, Mary Pat  Angelini.

United States Department of State
Starting in April 2018, Casagrande entered the U.S. Department of State as a political appointee of the Trump Administration as the Special Advisor to Assistant Secretary Marie Royce in the Bureau of Educational and Cultural Affairs.

Casagrande was sworn into the position of Deputy Assistant Secretary of Academic Programs in September 2018 with the responsibility of  shaping policy across the interagency and stewarding resources in excess of 400 million dollars.  In this role, Casagrande oversaw the flagship Fulbright Scholarship program, the Education USA Network of 435 global recruitment centers, 630 overseas American Spaces, State Department sponsored English language education programming, the Humphrey Fellowship, Gilman Scholarships, undergraduate exchanges, and teacher exchanges.  

Casagrande also served on the National Security Education Board. 

As the Deputy Assistant Secretary for Academic Programs, Casagrande promoted the message that the United States welcomes international students when questioned if the Trump administration's immigration policy had led to a decrease in foreign enrollment at US universities.

Casagrande's State Department appointment ended with President Trump's term on January 20, 2021.

Countries visited to promote US academics for international students 

 India, March 2019.
 Colombia, May 2019.
 Bahamas, May 2019.
 Brazil, August 2019.
 China, September 2019.
 Austria, December 2019.
 Italy, December 2019.
 Mexico, January 2020.

Rutgers University 
Casagrande was a Visiting Associate of the Rutgers-Eagleton Institute of Politics until 2019.

In 2018, Casagrande was featured in a Rutgers television commercial about training women running for public office.

References

1976 births
Living people
Republican Party members of the New Jersey General Assembly
New Jersey lawyers
Pennsylvania State University alumni
People from Colts Neck Township, New Jersey
People from Point Pleasant, New Jersey
People from Spring Lake, New Jersey
Politicians from Monmouth County, New Jersey
Politicians from Ocean County, New Jersey
Red Bank Catholic High School alumni
Rutgers School of Law–Camden alumni
Women state legislators in New Jersey
21st-century American politicians
21st-century American women politicians
United States Department of State
United States Department of State officials
Bureau of Educational and Cultural Affairs